was a short-lived female Japanese pop unit formed in 2003, consisting of five singers also active in other pop bands from Hello! Project. The group only released one single, "Sexy Night: Wasurerarenai Kare", on August 20, 2003, ranking N°10 on Oricon charts, and disbanded the same year.

Members
Mari Yaguchi (from bands Morning Musume, Tanpopo, Minimoni)
Rika Ishikawa (from bands Morning Musume, Tanpopo, and later V-u-den and Ongaku Gatas)
Mai Satoda (from band Country Musume, and later Ongaku Gatas)
Hitomi Saito (from band Melon Kinenbi)
Ayaka Kimura (from band Coconuts Musume)

Discography

Single

References

External links 
 Romans official discography

Japanese girl groups
Japanese pop music groups
Japanese idol groups
Hello! Project groups
Musical groups from Tokyo